The Slingsby T.38 Grasshopper is a British primary training glider built by Slingsby Sailplanes for the Royal Air Force.

Development
The design is based on the pre-World War II German SG 38 Schulgleiter, modified to use the wing design of the Slingsby T.7 Kirby Cadet glider.  The design was cheap to manufacture and was designed to be stored dismantled. The type was used by Air Training Corps Squadrons between 1952 and the late 1980s.

The RAF designated the glider the Grasshopper TX.1, and the first order was for 65 aircraft, which were delivered in 1952 and 1953.  It was later followed by two further orders for an additional 50 aircraft; the final delivery was made in 1963.

Launch is achieved through the use of a V-shaped bungee or elastic rope pulled by a team of helpers.  The glider can also be mounted on a pivoting tripod pointed into wind for the demonstration of controls.

The Grasshopper is virtually identical to the EoN Eton.

Operators

Royal Air Force

Specifications (Grasshopper TX.1)

See also

References

Notes

Bibliography

 Hardy, Michael. Gliders & Sailplanes of the World. London: Ian Allan, 1982.  .

1950s British military trainer aircraft
Glider aircraft
Grasshopper
Aircraft first flown in 1952
Parasol-wing aircraft